"Here to Stay" is a song by New Order and produced by The Chemical Brothers. It was released as a single in 2002, and reached number 15 in the UK Singles Chart.

Release 
"Here to Stay" was the closing track from the movie 24 Hour Party People, and was the only new song composed specifically for the film. Its music video compiled scenes from the movie in black and white, and featured John Simm (who played Bernard Sumner in the movie) and comedian/actor Steve Coogan (who played Tony Wilson) reprising their roles. The video was dedicated to Rob Gretton, Martin Hannett and Ian Curtis; three people instrumental in the founding of the band who had since died.

The track was released without major marketing, but still reached #15 in the UK chart.

The track was made available both as a standalone single and on the band's compilation International. It was also later included on the collection Singles, and an extended instrumental version was released on the box set Retro. A live version of the song features on the recording Live at Bestival 2012.

The single was B-sided with the track "Player in the League", New Order's failed entry for ITV's football highlights programme The Premiership. The track was originally slated for inclusion on Get Ready, but was dropped.

Track listing

Chart positions

References

New Order (band) songs
2002 singles
2002 songs
London Records singles
Songs written by Gillian Gilbert
Songs written by Peter Hook
Songs written by Stephen Morris (musician)
Songs written by Bernard Sumner